Fords is an unincorporated community and census-designated place (CDP) located within Woodbridge Township, in Middlesex County, New Jersey, United States. As of the 2010 United States Census, the CDP's population was 15,187.

History and Geography
The area as originally known as Fords Corner abuts neighboring Edison, part of which was once within Woodbridge Township, until an act of legislature in April of 1870 apportioned land to then called Raritan Township.
According to the United States Census Bureau, the CDP had a total area of 2.637 square miles (6.830 km2), including 2.633 square miles (6.820 km2) of land and 0.004 square miles (0.010 km2) of water (0.15%).

Demographics

Census 2010

Census 2000
As of the 2000 United States Census there were 15,032 people, 5,591 households, and 4,014 families living in the CDP. The population density was 2,240.9/km2 (5,800.5/mi2). There were 5,688 housing units at an average density of 847.9/km2 (2.,194.9/mi2). The racial makeup of the CDP was 72.86% White, 5.93% African American, 0.11% Native American, 16.11% Asian, 2.71% from other races, and 2.29% from two or more races. Hispanic or Latino of any race were 9.23% of the population.

There were 5,591 households, out of which 31.6% had children under the age of 18 living with them, 56.7% were married couples living together, 10.9% had a female householder with no husband present, and 28.2% were non-families. 23.4% of all households were made up of individuals, and 10.2% had someone living alone who was 65 years of age or older. The average household size was 2.69 and the average family size was 3.21.

In the CDP the population was spread out, with 22.5% under the age of 18, 7.0% from 18 to 24, 32.9% from 25 to 44, 22.4% from 45 to 64, and 15.3% who were 65 years of age or older. The median age was 38 years. For every 100 females, there were 93.3 males. For every 100 females age 18 and over, there were 92.4 males.

The median income for a household in the CDP was $61,015, and the median income for a family was $68,652. Males had a median income of $49,141 versus $36,591 for females. The per capita income for the CDP was $25,917. About 2.4% of families and 3.4% of the population were below the poverty line, including 3.5% of those under age 18 and 5.4% of those age 65 or over.

Education
Fords has three elementary schools — Ford Avenue School #14, Menlo Park Terrace School #19 and Lafayette Estates School #25 — and one middle school, Fords Middle School (Formerly Fords Junior High), all of which are a part of the Woodbridge Township School District.  MPT School #19 has a mailing address in Metuchen, however, children who live in parts of Fords attend the school.

Notable people

People who were born in, residents of, or otherwise closely associated with Fords include:
 Tim Mulqueen (born 1966), soccer goalkeeping coach and former goalkeeper who coached the US National Team at the 2008 Summer Olympics in Beijing.
 Craig Coughlin (born 1958), politician, who has served in the New Jersey General Assembly since 2010, where he represents the 19th Legislative District.

See also
List of neighborhoods in Woodbridge Township, New Jersey
List of neighborhoods in Edison, New Jersey

References

Neighborhoods in Woodbridge Township, New Jersey
Census-designated places in Middlesex County, New Jersey